Niemirów  is a village in the administrative district of Gmina Frampol, within Biłgoraj County, Lublin Voivodeship, in eastern Poland.

The locale's designation derives from the Slavic given name Niemir.

References

Villages in Biłgoraj County